Matidia is a genus of southeast Asian sac spiders first described by Tamerlan Thorell in 1878.

Species
 it contains seventeen species:
Matidia bipartita Deeleman-Reinhold, 2001 – Indonesia (Moluccas)
Matidia calcarata Thorell, 1878 – Indonesia (Ambon)
Matidia chlora Chrysanthus, 1967 – New Guinea
Matidia flagellifera Simon, 1897 – Sri Lanka
Matidia incurvata Reimoser, 1934 – India
Matidia mas Deeleman-Reinhold, 2001 – Thailand
Matidia missai Versteirt, Baert & Jocqué, 2010 – New Guinea
Matidia muju Chrysanthus, 1967 – New Guinea
Matidia paranga (Barrion & Litsinger, 1995) – Philippines
Matidia simia Deeleman-Reinhold, 2001 – Indonesia (Sulawesi)
Matidia simplex Simon, 1897 – Sri Lanka
Matidia spatulata Chen & Huang, 2006 – China, Taiwan
Matidia strobbei Versteirt, 2010 – New Guinea
Matidia trinotata Thorell, 1890 – Malaysia
Matidia virens Thorell, 1878 (type) – Indonesia (Moluccas, Sulawesi)
Matidia viridissima Strand, 1911 – Indonesia (Aru Is.)
Matidia xieqian Yu & Li, 2021 – China

References

Araneomorphae genera
Clubionidae
Taxa named by Tamerlan Thorell